The surname Turbeville  a derivation of the original de' Turberville derives , ville meaning town, place or residence. The first part may derive  or a Germanic word for turf, although others suggest that it relates to the Norse god Thor.

The Turbeville name was brought to England during the Norman French invasion of 1066. It is the surname of:
 William de Turbeville (c. 1095 – 1174), English Bishop of Norwich
 Deborah Turbeville (1932 – 2013), American fashion photographer
 George Turbeville (1914 – 1983), American Major League Baseball pitcher 
 Sir Henry de Turbeville (died 1239), English soldier and seneschal of Gascony

See also
Tess of the d'Urbervilles, novel by Thomas Hardy
Turbeville, South Carolina, named for Michael Turbeville and his family

References